Colpomenia sinuosa, commonly named the oyster thief or sinuous ballweed, is a brown algae species in the genus Colpomenia. It is the type species of its genus and is widespread in tropical to  temperate zones around the world.

Colpomenia sinuosa contains the C6-C4-C6 phenolic compound colpol.

Distribution
This species is common in the intertidal and on reef flats, often growing on other algae or rocky substrates. In Hawaiʻi it is found from the mid intertidal to about 20m depth. It can be found in New Zealand in the northeastern coasts of the North Island, the Kermadec Islands, and the Marlborough Sounds.

References

Further reading

External links
 
 

Ectocarpales
Species described in 1851
Biota of South Africa
Algae of Australia